Ravyan (also Romanized as Rāvyān and Rāvīyān; also known as Rūyān) is a village in Zeri Rural District, Qatur District, Khoy County, West Azerbaijan Province, Iran. At the 2006 census, its population was 1,375, in 251 families.

References 

Populated places in Khoy County